In the 2013–14 season, Partizani Tirana competed in the Kategoria Superiore after it returned from the Kategoria e Parë to the top flight after four seasons of absence.

First-team squad
Squad at end of season

Left club during season

Competitions

Kategoria Superiore

League table

Results summary

Results by round

Matches

Albanian Cup

First round

Second round

Notes

References

External links
Official website 

Partizani
FK Partizani Tirana seasons